The 1997 NLL Draft composed of nine rounds where 72 lacrosse players were selected. The draft was completed on a conference call with all the teams coaches.

1st round
 Denotes player who never played in the NLL regular season or playoffs

2nd round
 Denotes player who has been selected for at least one All-Pro Team and had won at least one NLL Award
 Denotes player who never played in the NLL regular season or playoffs

3rd round
 Denotes player who won at least one NLL Award
 Denotes player who never played in the NLL regular season or playoffs

4th round
 Denotes player who never played in the NLL regular season or playoffs

5th round
 Denotes player who never played in the NLL regular season or playoffs

6th round
 Denotes player who won at least one NLL Award
 Denotes player who never played in the NLL regular season or playoffs

7th round
 Denotes player who never played in the NLL regular season or playoffs

8th round
 Denotes player who never played in the NLL regular season or playoffs

9th round
 Denotes player who never played in the NLL regular season or playoffs

References

        
        
        
        
        

National Lacrosse League
Nll Draft, 1997